Yonehara (written: 米原) is a Japanese surname. Notable people with the surname include:

, Japanese manga artist
, Japanese singer and actor
, Japanese water polo player
, Japanese translator and writer
, Japanese footballer
, Japanese footballer

See also
 Maibara (米原)

Japanese-language surnames